Aboite may refer to:

Aboite, Indiana
Aboite Township, Allen County, Indiana